S1 Corporation was an American software development company based in Norcross, Georgia which specialized in payment processing and financial services software for automated teller machines and retail point of sale applications, primarily for banks, retailers and credit unions.  S1 Corporation was acquired by a competing payment software company, ACI Worldwide, Inc., during October 2011 for $9.95 per share.

S1 Corporation was originally the technology division of Security First Network Bank.

The company acquired the South African firm Mosaic Software during 2004 and acquired internet banking company PM Systems Corporation in March 2010. S1 Corporation attempted to acquire Israeli banking service firm Fundtech Ltd in 2011, however the private equity firm GTCR acquired FundTech, and S1 was acquired by ACI Worldwide instead.  The acquisition of S1 by ACI Worldwide was completed following ACI Worldwide's third takeover bid in as many months. The total value of the acquisition was estimated to be worth $515.7 million. James (Chip) S. Mahan III served as chief executive officer (CEO) from 1994, and was succeeded in 2001 by Jaime Ellertson, who served until 2005, after which Mahan was reappointed. Johann Dreyer, originally CEO of Mosaic Software, became S1's last chief executive officer in 2006, serving until S1 was acquired by ACI Worldwide in 2012.

See also
Security First Network Bank

References

External links
 S1 Corporation Homepage

Software companies based in Georgia (U.S. state)
2011 mergers and acquisitions
Defunct software companies of the United States